The Man with the Jazz Guitar is a 2012 British documentary film about Ken Sykora, one of Britain's finest jazz guitarists and most popular radio broadcasters.

Production

The film was shot in Suffolk, Glasgow and Argyll, Scotland between 2008 and 2010.

The research, production, filming, animation, editing, marketing and release of this handcrafted production was undertaken by the filmmakers, Marc Mason and Linda Chirrey.

Release

 The Man with the Jazz Guitar  was released in the United Kingdom on 11 May 2012.

It was selected for the 2013 Keswick Film Festival, the 2013 Tucson Film & Music Festival and the Jazz on Film section of the Melbourne International Jazz Festival. It has also appeared as part of the programme of a number of jazz festivals.

It was described by film critic Philip French as an “affectionate, affecting and altogether delightful documentary”.

Transmedia

 The Man with the Jazz Guitar is an independent cross-media/transmedia project told via multiple mediums: music, film, radio, print and digital.

The project was devised as follows: a feature documentary presenting his life story; a limited edition double CD of his music, digitally remastered; an online radio station dedicated to his work as a broadcaster; an online archive presenting personal photographs, jazz memorabilia and miscellaneous items reflecting his diverse interests and passions; social media channels to share his anecdotes and a multimedia website as the project's hub. In addition in 2017, Augmented reality experiences where created and the Ken Sykora App released.

References

External links
 
 

2012 films
British documentary films
2012 documentary films
Documentary films about jazz music and musicians
2010s English-language films
2010s British films